Sandra Mariët Beckerman (born 31 March 1983) is a Dutch politician of the Socialist Party.

Early life 
She was born in Veenendaal. Beckerman is a PhD archaeologist, specialised in ceramic analysis, and studied and worked at the University of Groningen.

Political career 
Beckerman was a member of the Provincial Council of Groningen from 2007 to 2017.

She was elected to the House of Representatives in the 2017 general election. She was re-elected in 2021.

References

External links 
 Dr. S.M. (Sandra) Beckerman, Parlement.com

Living people
1983 births
21st-century Dutch archaeologists
21st-century Dutch politicians
21st-century Dutch women politicians
Dutch women archaeologists
Members of the House of Representatives (Netherlands)
Members of the Provincial Council of Groningen
People from Veenendaal
Politicians from Groningen (city)
Socialist Party (Netherlands) politicians
University of Groningen alumni
Academic staff of the University of Groningen